Pyrostegia is a genus of plants in the family Bignoniaceae, native to tropical and subtropical areas of the Americas.

Species
, Plants of the World Online recognises two species:
Pyrostegia millingtonioides 
Pyrostegia venusta

References

Bignoniaceae
Bignoniaceae genera